Corsewall Lighthouse is a lighthouse at Corsewall Point, Kirkcolm near Stranraer in the region of Dumfries and Galloway in Scotland. First lit in 1817, it overlooks the North Channel of the Irish Sea. The definition of the name Corsewall is the place or well of the Cross.

History
In 1814, a Kirkman Finley applied to the Trade of Clyde for a lighthouse on Corsill Point. Robert Stevenson, inspected in December of that year and soon the 30 ft tower and house were in the first stages of construction.

Corsewall Lighthouse was exhibited in 1817 but that year, the Principal Keeper at Corsewall was reported for incompetence after falling asleep on duty as the revolving apparatus of the light had stopped for a certain period. They suspended him and he was to never chiefly monitor a lighthouse again and was demoted as an assistant at Bell Rock.

In November 1970, Concorde reportedly flew over the lighthouse on a trial flight and shattered panes of glass on the lighthouse. Later flights did not affect it.

Although the light is still operated by the Northern Lighthouse Board, since automation in 1994 the rest of Corsewall Lighthouse has been converted into the Corsewall Lighthouse Hotel.

See also

List of lighthouses in Scotland
List of Northern Lighthouse Board lighthouses
List of Category A listed buildings in Dumfries and Galloway

References

External links

 Corsewall Lighthouse Hotel
 Northern Lighthouse Board

Lighthouses completed in 1817
Category A listed buildings in Dumfries and Galloway
Category A listed lighthouses
Tourist attractions in Dumfries and Galloway
Hotels in Dumfries and Galloway
Works of Robert Stevenson (civil engineer)
1817 establishments in Scotland
Rhins of Galloway